United Nations Security Council Resolution 2510 was unanimously adopted on 12 February 2020. It calls for a nationwide ceasefire in Libya and for enforcement of the Libya arms embargo. According to the resolution, the cease-fire does not apply to military operations against the Government of National Accord and Khalifa Haftar.

Russia abstained from the vote.

See also
2019–20 Western Libya offensive
 List of United Nations Security Council Resolutions 2501 to 2600 (2019–2021)

References

External links
 Text of the Resolution at undocs.org

 2510
February 2020 events
2020 in Libya
United Nations Security Council resolutions concerning Libya
Second Libyan Civil War